Eminectomy is a surgical procedure that reduces the articular eminence to correct chronic dislocation or closed lock of the mandible. The temporoparietal fascia, which is the most superficial fascia layer beneath the subcutaneous fat, is the galea's lateral extension and is continuous with the superficial musculoaponeurotic layer (SMAS). Divide the dissection into thirds. The upper third of the body is completed first. The second section of the dissection is contained within the incision's lower third.

When bilateral eminectomy is required, the procedure is repeated on the contralateral side. The third section of the dissection connects the incision's middle third to the dissection's superior and inferior thirds. Ice packs are applied to the surgical area for 24 hours following eminectomy. Appropriate patient selection is critical for a successful eminectomy procedure.

References 

Surgical procedures and techniques